Elk Mountain is a  high mountain in Lake County, California, United States.

Physical

Elk Mountain is in the Northern California Coast Ranges.
It is in Mendocino National Forest in Lake County, California.
It drains into the Sacramento River.
The mountain is to the north of the point where the east and west forks of Middle Creek converge.

Elk Mountain Road

Elk Mountain Road runs from Upper Lake north to Lake Pillsbury on Eel River.
The Elk Mountain Road (National Forest Route M1) is a dirt road that is the main access route into the Mendocino National Forest.

Recreation

Elk Mountain is used for hang-gliding and paragliding.
The primary landing zone is in the Middle Creek Campground.

Notes

Sources

Mountains of Lake County, California